Paşalimanı Island, formerly Halone, is a small island in the southern Sea of Marmara in Turkey. The island is the fourth biggest island (21.3 km2) of Turkey and administratively belongs to the Erdek town of Balikesir Province in northwestern Turkey. The island has five small villages and has 962 population in total. Paşalimanı Island is also part of the Marmara Archipelago along with three other islands Marmara, Avşa and Ekinlik.

History

Paşalimani Island was first inhabited during the Chalcolithic age same as the neighbouring islands of Avşa and Marmara. According to Hittite sources the area was under the rule of Troy (Wilusa) during 1300s BC. In 844 BC Ionian colonizers from Miletus occupied the area and they were the first Greek-speaking inhabitants. In 493 BC the island was ravaged by Phoenicians since the islanders were against the Persian invasions. Consequently new Ionian settlers brought and settled from Miletus and Samos island. Halonia island was under Byzantine rule until the Ottoman Empire captured the archipelago in 15th century. During the Ottoman period, until 1923 Greeks and Turks lived together in peace. In 1923 Turkey and Greece agreed to exchange the population and Greek-speaking people of the island left. Today the local people of the island are originally from Greece, Bosnia and Black Sea Region of Turkey.

Climate

Paşalimanı Island has predominantly Mediterranean climate, at the same time some effects of the Black Sea climate are observed. It gets more rainfall in the summer months comparing to the Mediterranean climate. During the winter the island may also gets some snow from time to time due to the cold weather from the north.

Villages and population

Paşalimanı Island has five villages and does not have any administrative central town. Contrary to the other surrounding islands, Paşalimanı island belongs to Erdek Province, not to Marmara, the central town of the archipelago.

 Harmanlı; 285 pop.
 Paşalimanı; 180 pop.
 Poyrazlı; 184 pop.
 Balıklı; 159 pop.
 Tuzla; 154 pop.

See also
 1935 Erdek–Marmara Islands earthquake
 Avşa Island
 Balıkesir
 List of islands of Turkey
 Marmara Island

References

External links
 Governorship of Balıkesir
 Travelingturks

Islands of the Sea of Marmara
Islands of Turkey
Populated places in Balıkesir Province
Islands of Balıkesir Province